FNL may refer to:

 Czech National Football League
 Far North Line, a rail line in Scotland
 Fluctuation and Noise Letters, a scholarly journal
 Fort Collins-Loveland Municipal Airport in Colorado, United States
 Fox News Live, an American news program
 Friday Night Lights (disambiguation)
 Friday Night Live (disambiguation)
 National Forces of Liberation in Burundi
 National Front for the Liberation of South Vietnam
 Russian Football National League (Russian: , '')